The 9 teams were divided into 3 groups of 3 teams each. The teams played against each other on a home-and-away basis. The group winners would qualify. Brazil did not participate, as they were granted a spot in the finals after winning the 1962 World Cup.

Results Group 1

 

|stadium = Montevideo, Uruguay
|referee =Dimas Larrosa (Paraguay)
|attendance = 16,439
|nobars = 1
}}
 

 

 

 

Uruguay qualified.

Results Group 2

Play-off 
Chile and Ecuador finished level on points, and a play-off on neutral ground was played to decide who would qualify.

Chile qualified.

Results Group 3(C) 

 

 

 

 

 

Argentina qualified.

Qualified Teams

1 Bold indicates champions for that year. Italic indicates hosts for that year.

Goalscorers

5 goals

 Héctor Silva

4 goals

 Pedro Virgilio Rocha

3 goals

 Luis Artime
 Ermindo Onega
 Alberto Fouilloux
 Leonel Sánchez
 Enrique Raymondi
 Pedro Pablo León

2 goals

 Raúl Bernao
 Carlos Campos Sánchez
 Rubén Marcos
 Eugenio Méndez
 Ignacio Prieto
 Antonio Rada
 Hermenegildo Segrera
 Alberto Pedro Spencer
 Luis Zavalla

1 goal

 Fortunato Castillo
 Ramón Quevedo
 Rolando Vargas
 Romulo Gómez
 Washington Muñoz
 Celino Mora
 Vicente Rodríguez
 Juan Carlos Rojas
 Nemesio Mosquera
 Jesús Peláez Miranda
 Víctor Zegarra
 Danilo Menezes
 José Urruzmendi
 Freddy Elie
 Rafael Santana
 Humberto Francisco Scovino
 Argenis Tortolero

1 own goal

 José Ramos Delgado (playing against Bolivia)
 Ricardo González (playing against Argentina)

References

 
World
FIFA World Cup qualification (CONMEBOL)